Theodore Newton Vail (July 16, 1845 – April 16, 1920) was president of American Telephone & Telegraph between 1885 and 1889, and again from 1907 to 1919. Vail saw telephone service as a public utility and moved to consolidate telephone networks under the Bell system. In 1913 he oversaw the Kingsbury Commitment that led to a more open system for connection.

Biography

Early life and career
Theodore was born on July 16, 1845, in Malvern, Ohio, and he was educated in Morristown, New Jersey. At first he studied medicine with his uncle. He also studied telegraphy. Success in the latter led him to go to New York, where he became manager of a local telegraphy office.

He then joined the staff of a superintendent of United States Telegraph which ultimately became Western Union.

He went west with his father in 1866 to farm. In the fall of 1868, he was made operator and afterward agent at Pine Bluffs, Wyoming, on the Union Pacific Railroad. Pine Bluffs was at that time the principal supply point for wood for The Union Pacific, which had not then been completed.

In the Spring of 1869, Vail was appointed clerk of the railway mail service between Omaha and Ogden. His success in getting the mail through during the snow blockage of 1870, came to the attention of upper management.

He was promoted to the Chicago and Iowa City railway post office, an important distribution point at the time. When the railway post office was established on The Union Pacific, Vail was promoted to head clerk.

In March, 1873, Vail was assigned to duty in the office of the General Superintendent of Railway Mail Service, Washington, D.C. There he exercised special oversight of distribution of the mails, and justified to Congress the compensation the railways received for carrying the mail. In June, 1874, he was appointed Assistant Superintendent of Railway Mail Service. In 1875, he became Assistant General Superintendent.

In February, 1876, Vail was appointed General Superintendent after his boss retired. He had reached the highest grade attainable in this branch of the Federal government. He was the youngest officer in the Railway Mail Service, both in years and terms of service. When this final appointment was made by the Postmaster General, the latter said that his only objection to Vail was his youth.

As General Superintendent, Vail helped put postal employees under the general civil service laws. He established the system of six months' probationary appointments, which were subsequently adopted by all agencies.

American Bell and AT&T 
The American Bell Telephone Co. had been organized by Gardiner G. Hubbard, father in law of Alexander Graham Bell. As a lawyer and lobbyist, Hubbard had opposed the Post Office Department before Congress on various issues.
Vail became convinced as a result of his association with Hubbard that the telephone would eventually revolutionize world communication, and he became a vigorous, though generally unsuccessful, promoter of Bell stock.
Hubbard was impressed with Vail and offered him the position of general manager of the American Bell Telephone Company in 1878. Vail defended the Bell patents successfully from challenges from Western Union and others. He introduced the use of copper wire in telephone and telegraph lines.

Personal life
Vail was a first cousin to Alfred Vail instrumental in developing the first telegraph.

In August 1869, Vail married Emma Righter (November 6, 1844 – February 3, 1905), of Newark, New Jersey. They had one son, Davis Righter Vail (July 18, 1870 – December 20, 1906), who died after a 10-day bout with typhoid fever in 1906.

He first visited Vermont in 1883. This led to his eventual purchase of a  farm in Lyndon, Vermont, Speedwell Farms, site of conferences which culminated in the creation of American Telephone & Telegraph.

He was a member of the Union League Club of New York and the Algonquin Club of Boston and the Jekyll Island Club.

Later years and death

In 1888, Vail retired, temporarily as it turned out, and devoted his time to travel and adventure in South America, and promoting the use of the telephone abroad. In 1890 he received a concession from the federal government of Argentina to build a generating station at Cordoba to supply power to a trolley system in Buenos Aires. Vail had purchased a horse-drawn streetcar line serving the city. He later bought out all competing lines and consolidated the system.

The Vail Mansion in Morristown, New Jersey was built 1916–1918 as his residence. It was the Morristown Municipal Building for over 75 years. It is now a condominium.

Vail died on April 16, 1920, at Johns Hopkins Hospital in Baltimore, Md. He had been brought to Baltimore from Jekyll Island, Ga. in his personal rail car. Jekyll Island was a winter retreat for wealthy northern industrialists.

As a tribute to Vail, telephone service across the United States was halted for one minute on the morning of April 18, 1920, while his funeral was being conducted in Parsippany, New Jersey.  From 11:00 to 11:01, Eastern time (8:00 to 8:01 a.m. Pacific Time), A T & T telephone operators disconnected calls.  At the time, "This caused temporary silence of about 12,000,000 telephones and 24,000,000 miles of telephone wire."

Legacy
In his historical review of AT&T, John Brooks explained Vail's contribution to enlightened corporate policy:
Vail’s presidential essays in AT&T annual reports are like nothing else in American business literature, before or since. They are personal, revealing, discursive, and sometimes pontifical. "If we don’t tell the truth about ourselves, someone else will", Vail said in 1911. ... In 1907 he led off with a section entitled "Public Relations" – by which, as the context made clear, he meant not advertising and promotion, but the whole scope of relations between the corporation and the public. ... Vail introduced the concept ... that maximum private profit was not necessarily the primary objective of private enterprise. Profit was necessary to insure financial health...but was only one element in an equation.

Other accomplishments
Vail founded the Vermont School of Agriculture in 1910 in Lyndon, Vermont. This was subsequently merged into a preparatory school, Lyndon Institute.

He acquired the scientific book collection of George Edward Dering in 1911 and presented it to the library of Massachusetts Institute of Technology. The Vail Collection covers topics including "electricity, magnetism, lighter-than-air travel, animal magnetism" and others.

Vail co-founded Junior Achievement in 1919.

Namesakes
Vail Campus, Lyndon Institute, Lyndon, Vermont.

References

Further reading

External links

 

1845 births
1920 deaths
American telecommunications industry businesspeople
Public relations pioneers
American chief executives
Businesspeople from Ohio
Junior Achievement
Vail family
AT&T people
People from Malvern, Ohio